The following is a list of unusual drainage systems.

List

Bifurcation rivers (active)
 The Casiquiare canal – natural waterway connecting the Orinoco and Amazon rivers.
 The Chicago River and Calumet River artificially divert water from the Great Lakes to the Mississippi.
 The Echimamish River in Canada connects the Hayes and Nelson rivers and was much used as a shortcut by voyageurs.
 The Mississippi River, Red River, and Atchafalaya River are connected via Old River. Historically, the direction of flow was controlled by which river was higher, but is now controlled by man-made structures to prevent the Mississippi River from changing course, and overtaking the Atchafalaya River, which provides a much shorter path to the Gulf of Mexico.
 The Nerodimka drains into the Aegean and Black seas.
 Parting of the Waters, Wyoming, where Two Ocean Creek divides into Pacific Creek and Atlantic Creek, ultimately flowing into their namesake oceans.
 , Neuquén, Argentina
 Slims River: In the spring of 2016 a melting glacier diverted most of the Slims River from the Bering Sea to the Gulf of Alaska watershed.
 Tärendö River – in Sweden
 The Selinda Spillway of the Cuando River of Angola, Namibia and Botswana

Bifurcation rivers (extinct)
 The Chu River in Kyrgyzstan flows east to within a few kilometres of Lake Issyk-Kul, makes a hairpin turn, and flows west without entering the lake.
 The Manych River east of the Black Sea formerly flowed both east and west.

Bifurcation lakes
Bontecou Lake in New York outflows into two watersheds, those of the Hudson and Housatonic rivers. 
The artificial Gatun Lake in Panama drains into the Atlantic and Pacific.
 Isa Lake in Yellowstone National Park drains to the Atlantic and Pacific.
 At the summit of Athabasca Pass in the Canadian Rockies is a small lake, the Committee's Punch Bowl, that drains both east and west.
 Wollaston Lake in Canada is the world's largest bifurcation lake, draining both northwest to the Arctic Ocean and northeast to Hudson Bay.
 Lake Diefenbaker – in Canada
Lac Sainte-Anne located at N50.14222° W67.86399° north of Baie Comeau Quebec is shown on Canadian government topographical maps as draining into Rivière Toulnustouc and also into Rivière Godbout Est
Lesjaskogsvatnet in Norway is the source of the rivers Gudbrandsdalslågen and Rauma, which eventually flow into the Skagerrak and the Norwegian Sea, respectively.
 Inhottu, Isojärvi, Kivesjärvi, Kuolimo, Lummene, Vehkajärvi and Vesijako – in Finland
 Lake Manapouri in New Zealand has been modified as part of a hydroelectric scheme such that it drains (naturally) south to Foveaux Strait via the Waiau River and (artificially) west via a constructed tunnel to Doubtful Sound
 Lake Okeechobee in Florida is a particularly rare example of a trifurcation lake. Via the artificial Okeechobee Waterway, it flows east to the Atlantic Ocean through the St. Lucie River and west to the Gulf of Mexico through the Caloosahatchee River. Meanwhile, part of the lake's water naturally flows south through the Everglades into the Florida Bay
 Heavenly Lake on‌ the North Korea–People's Republic of China border.‌

Other unusual systems
 The Kootenay River in British Columbia, a tributary of the Columbia River, passes a mere two kilometers from the source of the Columbia River, Columbia Lake.
 The Tonlé Sap River in Cambodia flows north in the wet season and south in the dry season.
Lake Torrens in Australia, a normally endorheic lake that drains into the Spencer Gulf (Indian Ocean) via the Pirie–Torrens corridor after sufficiently extreme rainfall events.
 Lake Vostok is a subglacial lake beneath the Antarctic ice cap.
 Bahr Yussef – in Egypt.
 Traverse Gap, an ancient river valley now crossed by a continental divide; in historic times it was possible to ascend a watercourse from one side and descend the watercourse on the other.
 The AuSable River and Manistee River in Michigan, which drain into Lake Huron and Lake Michigan respectively, pass within 3 miles of each other in Crawford County.
 The Inland Waterway of Michigan, a chain of rivers and lakes flowing into Lake Huron come within half of a mile of Lake Michigan
 Semuc Champey – in Guatemala. That Cahabón River flows under a natural bridge supporting limestone-rimmed pools.
 The Danube Sinkhole near Möhringen, where the waters of the upper Danube river, which flows into the Black Sea, can sink into the Danube riverbed, through a system of caverns, that outflow towards the Radolfzeller Aach, a creek that flows into Rhine River, which flows into the North Sea.

See also
 River bifurcation

Hydrology
Geomorphology
 
Bifurcation lakes
Lists of things considered unusual